Américo Martins Pereira Júnior, commonly known as Américo, (born March 19, 1993) is a Brazilian professional footballer who plays for Cabofriense as a defender.

References

1993 births
Living people
Brazilian footballers
Figueirense FC players
Nacional Esporte Clube (MG) players
Esporte Clube Internacional de Lages players
Campeonato Brasileiro Série A players
Association football defenders